Sandanski (formerly known as Sveti Vrach, until 1947) is a town and a recreation centre in south-western Bulgaria, part of Blagoevgrad Province. Named after the Bulgarian revolutionary Yane Sandanski, it is situated in Sandanski–Petrich Valley at the foot of Pirin Mountains, along the banks of Sandanska Bistritsa River. Sandanski is about 20 km away from Bulgaria-Greece border and 100 km away from Aegean sea.

The town has a convenient location, a mild to warm climate (with the highest average annual temperature in the country, +16°C) and relatively high concentration of thermal water springs, which all make it a popular destination for relaxation and recreation.

Geography
Sandanski is located in the Sandanski–Petrich Valley, surrounded by the Pirin, Belasitsa and Ograzhden mountain ranges. The town is about 160 km south from Bulgaria's capital Sofia along the major European Route E79. Following the same route at almost the same distance is Thessaloniki, Greece's second largest city.

Sandanski has developed in an amphitheatrical fashion on the outer south-west flanks of Pirin Mountains along the lower reaches of Sandanska Bistritsa River. The town's altitude varies between 240 and 300 meters. Its geographical location between Kresna and Rupel Gorges determines town's mild winter temperatures. Statistically Sandanski has the warmest temperatures in Bulgaria with a total of around 2700 annual sunshine hours.

Within a short drive from Sandanski is Melnik, the smallest town in Bulgaria in terms of population, but an attractive tourist destination for its authentic architecture and wine production. In a close proximity are the village of Rozhen and Rozhen Monastery. The Ancient Roman city of Parthicopolis was located nearby.

Climate
Sandanski is on the northern border of the continental mediterranean climate. Summers are very hot and dry with occasional thunderstorms and during heat waves the temperature may exceed 40 °C reaching to 45 °C, the highest recorded temperature in the city. Winters are damp and relatively mild, lasting for about three months from December through February. Springs and falls are generally about two months each. The summer is longest season in Sandanski, lasting 4 months – from early June to late September. Precipitation is evenly distributed throughout the year except for July and August when droughts often occur.

Climate table:

Municipality
Sandanski is the seat of Sandanski Municipality, which includes the following 54 places:

Honour
Sandanski Point on Livingston Island in the South Shetland Islands, Antarctica is named after the town of Sandanski.

References

External links

 Sandanski Online – Information, news, articles, photography, maps, companies and services from Sandanski and the region.
 Sandanski Online – The most comprehensive resource to Sandanski & Surroundings
 Sandanski.org – Site of the Town Of Sandanski
 Sandanski.info
 Guide to Sandanski municipality, Blagoevgrad
 Pictures from Sandanski

 
Spa towns in Bulgaria